Dome Rock is an andesite formation of the Old Cascades in the Willamette National Forest. The mountain is best known for its hiking trail that goes to the summit. Dome Rock lies in Linn County, Oregon. About 3 miles southeast of Dome Rock is the small town of Detroit.

References

Mountains of Oregon
Mountains of Marion County, Oregon